Hugh Moorhead Neil (2 October 1936 – 12 November 1978) was a Scottish professional footballer who played as a right back. Active in both Scotland and England, Neil made over 250 career league appearances.

Career

Playing career
Born in Cumnock, Neil began his career with non-league Lugar Boswell Thistle, before playing League football with Falkirk, Rangers, St Johnstone and Carlisle United.

After football
After retiring as a player in 1969, Neil became Carlisle's chief scout.

Death
Neil died on 12 November 1978, at the age of 42, following a car crash nine days previously.

References

1936 births
1978 deaths
Scottish footballers
Lugar Boswell Thistle F.C. players
Falkirk F.C. players
Rangers F.C. players
St Johnstone F.C. players
Carlisle United F.C. players
English Football League players
Road incident deaths in England
Scottish Football League players
Association football fullbacks
Carlisle United F.C. non-playing staff